Carl Oskar Hysén (12 July 1911 – 12 February 1992) was a Swedish footballer who played as a left back. He played for IFK Göteborg between 1926 and 1938. He was the brother of Erik Hysén, the great-uncle of Glenn Hysén, and the great-great uncle of Tobias Hysén, Alexander Hysén, and Antonio Hysén.

Honours 
IFK Göteborg

 Allsvenskan: 1934–35

References 

1911 births
Swedish footballers
Allsvenskan players
Association football midfielders
IFK Göteborg players
People from Härryda Municipality